Dan Einbinder (born 16 February 1989) is an Israeli professional footballer who plays for Hapoel Tel Aviv. At international level, Einbinder was capped at under-18 and under-19 level, and made his senior debut in 2016.

Early life
Einbinder was born and raised in Mevaseret Zion, Israel, to an Israeli family of Ashkenazi Jewish descent.

Career
Einbinder started his youth career in Beitar Jerusalem, winning the championship title along with the State Cup in the 2006–07 season. In the 2007–08 season the team won a consecutive championship title win in the Israeli Noar Premier League with Einbinder in the starting lineup.

For the 2008–09 season Einbinder signed a four-year contract with the senior team of Beitar Jerusalem and participated in 4 league games with the club. During the 2009–10 season he was a regular choice to the first team.

On 3 September 2012, Einbinder signed a three-year contract with Ironi Kiryat Shmona for a transfer fee of 1.3 million Israeli new shekels. Overall, he played 29 league games for the club.

On 9 June 2013, Einbinder joined Maccabi Tel Aviv for three years in a deal that included the transfers of Guy Haimov and Tamir Kahlon to Ironi Kiryat Shmona. He made his debut for the club on 6 August 2013, in a UEFA Champions League knock-out match against the Swiss side FC Basel. On 8 September 2015 released from Maccabi.

On 4 October 2015, signed back at Beitar Jerusalem.

In 2017, he signed at Hapoel Be'er Sheva

In January 2021, he signed at Hapoel Tel-Aviv and turned to a significant figure in the dressing room and on the pitch.

International career
Einbinder received his first call up to the senior Israel squad on 31 August 2016, for a 2018 FIFA World Cup qualifier against Italy.
On 12 November 2016, Einbender scored his first ever international goal for Israel in a 2018 FIFA World Cup qualifier against Albania. It was only his second cap and Israel won 3–0.

Honours

Club
Beitar Jerusalem
 Israeli Premier League: 2007–08
 Israel State Cup: 2007–08, 2008–09
 Toto Cup: 2019–20

Maccabi Tel Aviv
 Israeli Premier League: 2013–14, 2014–15
 Israel State Cup: 2014–15
 Toto Cup: 2014–15

Hapoel Beer Sheva
 Israel Super Cup: 2017

See also 
 List of Jewish footballers
 List of Jews in sports
 List of Israelis

References

External links
 
 

1989 births
Living people
Israeli Jews
Israeli footballers
Ashkenazi Jews
People from Mevaseret Zion
Footballers from Jerusalem District
Israel international footballers
Beitar Jerusalem F.C. players
Hapoel Ironi Kiryat Shmona F.C. players
Maccabi Tel Aviv F.C. players
Hapoel Be'er Sheva F.C. players
Hapoel Tel Aviv F.C. players
Israeli Premier League players
Association football midfielders